Farewell of a Slav Woman is a 1985 Soviet drama film directed by Yevgeny Vasilev.

Plot 
The film tells about a retired aviation colonel who goes to rest in Crimea and tries to find a place there for the night. He meets Anna Ivanovna, whom he wants to spend the night with. He looks at the photographs in her house and suddenly recognizes himself in one of them in his youth.

Cast 
 Galina Makarova
 Yevgeni Lebedev
 Yuriy Nazarov
 Natalya Gundareva
 Yekaterina Vasilyeva
 Timofey Spivak		
 Mayya Bulgakova
 Anatoliy Egorov
 Nadezhda Viktorova	
 Natalya Ostrikova

References

External links 
 

1985 films
1980s Russian-language films
Soviet drama films
1985 drama films